Leda Gloria (30 August 1908 – 16 March 1997) was an Italian film actress. She appeared in 66 films between 1929 and 1965. During the expansion of Italian cinema of the Fascist era of the 1930s and early 1940s she appeared in starring roles, later transitioning into character parts after the Second World War. She appeared in the Don Camillo series of films, playing the wife of Gino Cervi's Giuseppe Bottazzi.

Selected filmography

 Girls Do Not Joke (1929)
 There Is a Woman Who Never Forgets You (1930)
 Ninna nanna delle dodici mamme (1930)
 Mother Earth (1931) – Emilia
 Figaro and His Great Day (1931) – Nina
 Palio (1932) – Fiora
 The Table of the Poor (1932) – Giorgina Fusaro
 The Blue Fleet (1932) – Olga Rosati
 Il trattato scomparso (1933) – Anna – sua figlia
 The Three-Cornered Hat (1935) – Carmela, moglie di Luca
 Territorial Militia (1936) – Martina
 Nozze vagabonde (1936) – Diana
 Just Married (1936) – Lucia
 Sette giorni all'altro mondo (1936) – Elena Santarelli
 The Ambassador (1936)
 King of Diamonds (1936)
 The Three Wishes (1937) – Dora Corelli, la cantante
 Bayonet (1938)
 Duetto vagabondo (1939) – La vedova
 The Marquis of Ruvolito (1939) – Lily Gordon
 La grande luce - Montevergine (1939) – Sabina
 L'aria del continente (1939)
 The Palace on the River (1940)
 Antonio Meucci (1940) – Ester Meucci, sua moglie
 The Cavalier from Kruja (1940) – Alidjé
 Lucky Night (1941) – La sorella del principale
 La pantera nera''' (1942) – Sonya Harkaneck
 Souls in Turmoil (1942) – Anna
 La signorina (1942)
 Dagli Appennini alle Ande (1943) – Maria Ansaldi, sua madre
 Redenzione (1943)
 La moglie in castigo (1943)
 Vietato ai minorenni (1944)
 The Mill on the Po (1949) – La Sniza
 Ring Around the Clock (1950) – Rosa
 Side Street Story (1950) – Amalia, la moglie di Gennaro
 Strano appuntamento (1950) – Signora Rossi
 Last Meeting (1951) – Bianca, amica di Lina
 Red Moon (1951) – Donna Amalia (uncredited)
 Three Girls from Rome (1952) – Rosa, Elena's mother
 The Little World of Don Camillo (1952) – Madame Botazzi
 The Eternal Chain (1952) – Donna Teresa, madre di Maria
 Ergastolo (1952) – Rosa Lulli
 Rosalba, la fanciulla di Pompei (1952) – House Neighbour
 Le boulanger de Valorgue (1953) – Mme Zanetti, l'épicière
 It's Never Too Late (1953) – Anna Colussi
 The Return of Don Camillo (1953) – Signora Bottazzi
 It Happened in the Park (1953) – Signora Ventrella – la moglie di Donato (segment: Il paraninfo)
 Cuore di mamma (1954) – Donna Elvira
 Tragic Ballad (1954) – Signora Barone
 The Boatman of Amalfi (1954) – Rita Selva
 New Moon (1955) – madre di Giovanni
 Don Camillo's Last Round (1955) – Madame Botazzi
 Torna piccina mia! (1955) – Esther
 The Virtuous Bigamist (1956) – Lucia – la mère de Maria
 Amaramente (1956) – Madre di Marco
 Ciao, pais...  (1956) – Amala
 Guendalina (1957) – Madre di Oberdan
 Serenata a Maria (1957) – Pupella's and Maria's mother
 Il cocco di mamma (1958) – Aldo Manca's Mother
 The Law Is the Law (1958) – Antonietta La Paglia
 La sposa (1958) – Susanna
 The Woman of Ice (1960) – Zia Agata
 Cocagne (1961) – Mélanie
 Don Camillo: Monsignor (1961) – Madame Botazzi
 Don Camillo in Moscow'' (1965) – Madame Botazzi

References

External links

1908 births
1997 deaths
Italian film actresses
Actresses from Rome
20th-century Italian actresses